The Daredevil is a 1931 German crime film directed by Richard Eichberg and starring Hans Albers, Gerda Maurus and Mártha Eggerth.

The film's sets were designed by the art directors Hans Minzloff and Jacek Rotmil. It was shot on location in Hamburg and at the Johannisthal Studios in Berlin. Eichberg's assistant director was Géza von Cziffra.

Synopsis
A Port of Hamburg policeman, known by his colleagues as "The Daredevil" because of his propensity for action, rescues a young woman from the water. She appears to be connected with an American millionaire whose yacht is cruising off shore.

Cast
 Hans Albers as Hans Röder, Hafenpolizist
 Sigurd Lohde as Fred Patterson, ein reicher Amerikaner
 Ernst Stahl-Nachbaur as George Brown aka Mac Born
 Gerda Maurus as Gloria - seine Freundin
 Mártha Eggerth as Trude, Animierreiterin
 Fritz Klippel as Parker, Browns Komplize
 Reinhold Bernt as Willy, Stallmeister American Hyppodrom
 Leonard Steckel as Barini, Inhaber American Hippodrom
 Anna Müller-Lincke as Frau Pahlke, Inhaberin Artistenpension
 Eugen Burg as Andersen, Kriminalkommissar
 Senta Söneland as Fräulein Schönholz, Kriminalbeamtin
 Alfred Beierle as Martin Timm, Hafenpolizist

References

Bibliography

External links 
 

1931 films
1931 crime films
German crime films
Films of the Weimar Republic
1930s German-language films
Films directed by Richard Eichberg
Films shot in Hamburg
Films set in Hamburg
Films shot at Johannisthal Studios
German black-and-white films
1930s German films